The Hits is a 2000 compilation album by rap artist M.C. Hammer. It contains tracks from his first four albums.

Track listing
 "U Can't Touch This"
 "Addams Groove"
 "Too Legit to Quit"
 "This Is the Way We Roll"
 "Pray"
 "Turn This Mutha Out"
 "Gaining Momentum"
 "Do Not Pass Me By"
 "Let's Get It Started"
 "They Put Me In the Mix"
 "Black Is Black"
 "Help the Children"
 "Pump It Up (Here's the NEWS)"
 "Have You Seen Her"
 "U Can't Touch This (Club Version)"
 "Feel My Power"
 "Yo!! Sweetness"

References

2000 greatest hits albums
MC Hammer compilation albums